Events from the year 1812 in Russia

Incumbents
 Monarch – Alexander I

Events

  
 
  
  
 Patriotic Society (Russia)
 French invasion of Russia
  Fire of Moscow (1812)

Births

Nadezhda Borisovna Trubetskaya, philanthropist (died 1909)

Deaths

References

1812 in the Russian Empire
Years of the 19th century in the Russian Empire